The Prostate Cancer Foundation (PCF), headquartered in Santa Monica, California, funds research into the prevention and cure of prostate cancer.

Several important prostate cancer discoveries made in the past 30 years have been as a result of PCF's actions, whether in funding or in coordination. These results include the development of new medications, gene therapy approaches, and the development of vaccines that signal the body's immune system to kill cancer cells.

In 2017, 81% of every dollar spent goes to the prostate cancer research mission. Since 2007, more than $52.8 million has been awarded to the Young Investigator Program, a PCF program that gives recent MDs and PhDs the opportunity to conduct pivotal research at a critical point early in their careers as research scientists.

In 2017, the PCF Global Research Enterprise supported teamwork and team science with a portfolio that included 372 active research awards totaling $118 million. There are 220 active Challenge Award teams and 110 active Young Investigators, who represent the next generation of scientific discovery. PCF's efforts and advocacy have helped produce a 20-fold increase in government funding for prostate cancer research.

PCF set itself apart at its founding in 1993, when prostate cancer research was considered a dead end. PCF attempted a new model: invest in the most innovative and promising programs that merit major investment; reduce the red tape and shorten the time from grant request to response, so that the best-qualified researchers get answers sooner and get to work faster; form a community with researchers, investors and pharmaceutical companies so everyone can work toward the same goals. PCF's global influence now extends to 22 countries.

Charles Ryan, MD, a physician-scientist, medical oncologist, and leader in prostate cancer research is currently President and chief executive officer of the Foundation.

History
The Prostate Cancer Foundation, formerly known as CaP CURE, was founded in 1993 by Michael Milken following his personal battle with prostate cancer. After being diagnosed with prostate cancer, Milken traveled to many different specialists in the field. Citing a major lack of funding for prostate cancer research and roadblocks that existed within the grant application process, Milken created PCF to spur both private and government support in the field of research. In 2011, PCF established the Coalition to Cure Prostate Cancer in Canada and expanded global research efforts into China, partnering with the Chinese Urological Association and funding its first two Young Investigators in China. In early 2014, PCF launched The Norwegian Prostate Cancer Foundation.

In 2016, PCF expressed support for the goals of then-Vice President Joe Biden's Cancer Moonshot initiative.

Accomplishments
Through the Prostate Cancer Foundation's unique funding structure, PCF funding has been a major part of some of the most significant discoveries in the field of prostate cancer research. These discoveries and advancements include:
 supported research for new life prolonging treatments for advanced metastatic prostate cancer:
 Jevtana (cabazitaxel) – FDA Approved
 Xtandi (MDV3100)  - FDA Approved
 Zytiga (abiraterone) - FDA Approved
 Xgeva (denosumab) - FDA Approved
 Provenge (sipuleucel-T) - FDA Approved
 Xofigo (Radium-223 dichloride) – FDA Approved
 supported research of 97 drugs in Phase I or II trials, and 3 more PCF-supported therapeutics are rapidly working their way through Phase III clinical trials:
 Yervoy (ipilimumab) – FDA Approved for unresectable or metastatic melanoma
 identification of 30+ varieties (genotypes) of prostate cancer
 support of clinical trials through the Prostate Cancer Clinical Trials Consortium at 13 centers in the U.S.
 research into stopping the production or function of growth factors that help cancer cells grow
 research concerning anti-angiogenesis
 determination of the structure of the prostate cell androgen receptor, which is responsible for the growth of both normal and cancerous prostate cells;
 identification of prostate cell surface markers that can be targeted to destroy cancer cells
 development of analytical methods that identify the proteins in blood or the prostate that correlate to treatment effect or behavior of the cancer cell, a method known as proteomic pattern recognition.
 discovery of gene fusions in the ETS transcription factor family

Research and awards
PCF has streamlined the grant making process in order to make research funding more readily available. According to a 2004 Fortune magazine article, PCF's grant-giving model "is to stimulate research by drastically cutting the wait time for grant money, to flood the field with fast cash, to fund therapy-driven ideas rather than basic science, to hold researchers accountable for results and to demand collaboration across disciplines and among institutions, private industry, and academia."

PCF Research Enterprise Strategy 

To accelerate prostate cancer research and reduce red tape, PCF employs a "fast-track" awards process designed to maximize the time researchers spend searching for better treatments and a cure for prostate cancer. PCF follows a venture capital model of philanthropic investing, providing initial funding for high-impact, early-stage research projects that offer great hope for new treatments or better understanding of the disease. When these early investments demonstrate promising results, other institutional funders, such as the National Cancer Institute or biopharmaceutical companies, step in to provide the major funding needed to complete the work and bring a new drug or treatment to market.

Grant awardees are selected from a pool of applicants from around the world. Each submitted proposal is subjected to a rigorous peer review process in which the projects are assessed for their scientific merit and potential impact in the field of prostate cancer.  The PCF Standing Review Committee consists of approximately 74 preeminent scientists and members have expertise in various areas of science and medicine related to advance prostate cancer solutions. Each of these panelists adheres to confidentiality and conflict of interest policies to ensure PCF's award processes are free from bias. Priority is given to high-risk, first-in-field and currently unfunded projects—typically falling outside the parameters of conventional funding organizations.

All PCF award recipients must share their work within one year of receiving their funds, an innovative requirement for the industry. This unique stipulation encourages scientific cooperation and accelerates discovery. After the first year and the development of genetic testing of men at highest risk of prostate cancer, the number of requests for grants soared and prestige for PCF grants grew as well. Today, many other foundations have adapted their grant-making after PCF's model.

After careful evaluation by more than 40 experts in prostate cancer research and biotechnology, PCF revised its investment strategy in 2007. The current goal is to build on past successes and further accelerate the development of new therapies and the discovery of new information.

PCF Research Principles:
 Identify the most promising research not being funded
 Recruit the best scientists to energize the field
 Limit award applications to five pages
 Make award decisions within 60 days—fund them in no more than 90 days

Grants and awards
PCF's scientific strategic plan operates on the principle that longer term funding of milestone-driven research is needed in the field in order to reduce death and suffering from prostate cancer. The following awards are offered to help to reach this goal: Challenge, Young Investigator, and Creativity Awards.

Young Investigator Awards

The Young Investigator (YI) Program has been a pillar of PCF's Research Enterprise since its inception in 2007. YI awards are three-year investments in early-career scientists (recent MDs and PhDs) with the skills and expertise to rapidly advance high impact discoveries that can be translated to clinical practice. As part of the YI program, awardees are mentored by leaders in prostate cancer research. Each award is matched dollar-for-dollar by the investigator's institution. To date, PCF has provided funding to 255 YIs, representing a total investment of $52.8 million in 10 countries.

Challenge Awards

PCF Challenge Awards are multi-year awards supporting cross-disciplinary teams of research scientists. These teams are composed of scientists from three or more cancer centers. As a stipulation of funding, all PCF Challenge Award teams must include at least one PCF Young Investigator, demonstrating the Foundation's commitment to the career development of early and mid-career scientists.

Creativity Awards

PCF supports imaginative, innovative thinking with its Creativity Awards. These two-year awards for $300,000 support exceptionally novel projects with great potential to produce breakthroughs for detecting and treating prostate cancer. They are complementary and integrated with other PCF award programs.

Global expansion
PCF has expanded its global research network and partnerships through three important steps: the establishment of the Coalition to Cure Prostate Cancer (CCPC) in Canada, the launch of PCF China and the launch of The Norwegian Prostate Cancer Foundation. The Canadian entity monitors national research progress at Canadian cancer centers and universities. The PCF China initiative identifies, funds and promotes innovative research projects benefiting men around the world. In March 2012, PCF presented the first two Young Investigator awards to Chinese scientists at the inaugural China Prostate Cancer Symposium in Beijing. Moving forward, PCF will work with established Chinese institutions such as the Chinese Urological Association to expand cancer research and encourage sustainable collaborations.

In addition to offering clinical fellowships abroad, the Norwegian Prostate Cancer Foundation hosts an annual International Meeting on Prostate Cancer, where experts from around the world gather to present cutting-edge data on innovations in the field of prostate cancer.

PCF's emphasis on global collaboration and our support of public-private partnerships continue to accelerate discovery and expand access to patient information, leading to highly personalized treatment plans.

In 2020, PCF funded and launched the Prostate Cancer Theranostics and Imaging Centre of Excellence (ProsTIC) at the Peter MacCallum Cancer Centre in Melbourne, Australia.

Programming

The Prostate Cancer Foundation uses partnerships with many other organizations and celebrities to raise funds for prostate cancer research and to help spread awareness to the public.

Sports programs

Home Run Challenge

The MLB-PCF Home Run Challenge is a partnership with Major League Baseball that helps raises money for research through monetary pledges by baseball fans for each home run hit during all scheduled MLB games in the week leading up to Father's Day. The program is supported by many players, managers and their coaching staffs, umpires, and Major League teams, personalities and executives, such as the Minnesota Twins and Joe Torre. In the 2016 campaign, there were 241 home runs hit, raising an approximate total of $1.8 million. Since 1996, the MLB-PCF Home Run Challenge has raised more than $45 million for groundbreaking and life-saving prostate cancer research.

Golf Programs
Blue Ribbon Golf is a program utilizing golf tournaments of various sizes, at all types of golf courses and facilities, for supporting the Prostate Cancer Foundation.  The Blue Ribbon Golf Par-3 Challenge (formerly known as Arnie's Army Battles Prostate Cancer) is a series of one-day events built around a closest-to-the-pin contest on a par-3 hole.  The program began in 2002 behind legendary golfer Arnold Palmer and has sponsored over 2,000 events and raised more than $5.5 million in the fight again prostate cancer. Palmer is a prostate cancer survivor and the honorary golf chairman of the Prostate Cancer Foundation.

Other programs

Movember Foundation
In 2003, 30 Mo Bros in Australia began the Movember Foundation, which encourages men to grow and women to support the moustache during the 30 days of November to spark conversation and raise funds for men's health issues – including prostate cancer. PCF is an official beneficiary partner with the Movember Foundation for their U.S. campaign. To date, the Movember Foundation has raised approximately $44 million for PCF to support prostate cancer research.

Safeway Awareness Campaign
Over the course of PCF's partnership with The Safeway Foundation (Safeway, Inc.), many impactful advances in prostate cancer research have been realized. Most recently, funding from The Safeway Foundation fast-forwarded the research and development of the breakthrough therapy Xofigo, which is used to put metastatic bone tumors into remission. In less than 12 months since its launch, Xofigo allowed over 60,000 U.S. men to live pain free after exhausting all other treatment options. The Safeway program has generated nearly $83 million for PCF since 2001.

Scientific Retreat
Each year, the Prostate Cancer Foundation hosts a scientific retreat where teams of scientists and their institutions can share the results of their studies funded by the Foundation. The 24th Annual Prostate Cancer Foundation Scientific Retreat was held in October 2017 in Washington, DC, and was attended by more than 550 scientific leaders from academia, governmental agencies and the biopharmaceutical industry.

The Distinguished Gentlemen's Ride
Each year, smartly-dressed gentlefolk in over 400 cities from 79 countries will straddle the saddles of their café racers, bobbers, scramblers and other custom motorcycles to raise awareness and help fund the cure for prostate cancer.

See also
 Charlie Wilson (singer) (Wilson was successfully treated for prostate cancer and is the organization's national spokesman)

References

External links
 Prostate Cancer Foundation - homepage

Urology organizations
Cancer charities in the United States
Prostate cancer
Medical and health organizations based in California
Michael Milken